Count Angelo De Gubernatis (1840–26 February 1913), Italian man of letters, was born in Turin and educated there and at Berlin, where he studied philology. He was nominated for the Nobel Prize in Literature fourteen times.

Life
In 1862 he was appointed professor of Sanskrit at Florence, but having married a cousin of the Socialist Bakunin and become interested in his views he resigned his appointment and spent some years in travel. He was reappointed, however, in 1867; and in 1891 he was transferred to the University of Rome La Sapienza. He became prominent both as an orientalist, a publicist and a poet. He maintained close ties with Romanian orientalists. At International Congress of Orientalists from Florence in 1878 he invited Bogdan Petriceicu Haşdeu, a prominent Romanian writer and philologist. He was a good friend with the Romanian Princess Dora d'Istria (Elena Ghica) who collaborated with him at Rivista Orientale.

He also published a similar anthology for the visual arts and architecture.

Between 1881 and 1884 he conceived and directed a magazine for young women titled Cordelia, and in the first issue he invited readers to send in something to be published. One very early contributor, who later became the magazine's director, was Maria Majocchi who, at that time, preferred the pseudonym Margheritina di Cento and later became widely known as Jolanda.

De Gubernatis also edited the encyclopaedic  (1882–1885). He was elected as a member to the American Philosophical Society in 1886. 

He died in Rome.

References

External links
 
 

1840 births
1913 deaths
Italian male writers
Academic staff of the Sapienza University of Rome
Members of the American Philosophical Society